Robbie Lane and the Disciples is a Canadian rock band, that peaked in the 1960s. A cover of Neil Sedaka's "What Am I Gonna Do" was their biggest success, reaching #10 in 1966.  They also recorded an early version of the hit song "Soul Deep" in 1966.

Career

Beginning as Ronnie Hawkins' backup band, Robbie Lane & the Disciples later gained attention as the band for Canadian CTV-TV's It's Happening. Composed of guitarist Terry Bush, drummer Doug Copeland, harmonica player William Cudmore, keyboardist Paul Denyes, vocalist Robbie Lane, tenor saxophonist Paul Mifsud and bassist Gene Trach, the group recorded several singles during the mid-'60s. After an unsuccessful solo career in the mid-'70s, Robbie Lane (aka Robin Curry) and the band re-formed in the mid-'80s.

Singles
 "Fannie Mae" (1963) #17 [CHUM]
 "Ain't Love a Funny Thing" (1964) #12 [CAN] #16 [CHUM]
 "Sandy" (1965) #36 [CAN]
 "What Am I Gonna Do" (1966) #10 [CAN]
 "It's Happening"
 "You Gotta Have Love" (Robbie Lane solo)

The chart positions are from either the RPM Canadian singles chart or CHUM (Toronto) charts.

References

External Links
 Entry at canadianbands.com
 
 
 Entry at 45cat.com 

Canadian rock music groups
Musical groups established in 1963